Yves Allegro and Andreas Beck were the defending champions, but both players chose not to participate. Sanchai Ratiwatana and Sonchat Ratiwatana won the final 6–3, 6–1 against Alexander Bury and Mateusz Kowalczyk.

Seeds

Draw

Draw

References
 Doubles Draw

Kazan Kremlin Cup - Doubles
2012 Doubles
2012 in Russian tennis